SS William Grayson was a Liberty ship built in the United States during World War II. She was named after
William Grayson, a soldier, lawyer, and statesman from Virginia. Grayson was a delegate to the Confederation Congress from 1785 to 1787. He helped to pass the Northwest Ordinance, including a provision that forbade slavery in the Northwest Territory. He was one of the first two US Senators from Virginia, and belonged to the Anti-Federalist faction, he was also the first member of the United States Congress to die while holding office.

Construction
William Grayson was laid down on 16 July 1942, under a Maritime Commission (MARCOM) contract, MCE hull 310, by the Bethlehem-Fairfield Shipyard, Baltimore, Maryland; she was sponsored by Mrs. Albert W. Kabernagel, the wife of the chief inspector at Bethlehem-Fairfield Shipyard, and was launched on 31 August 1942.

History
She was allocated to Black Diamond Steamship Co., on 14 September 1942. On 18 May 1945, she was transferred to Greece, and renamed Kerkyra. She was returned to MARCOM on 13 November 1946. On 18 December 1946, she was sold for commercial use to Condylis Bros., for $544,506, and renamed Anna L. Condylis. She was scrapped in Taiwan, in 1968.

World War II Convoys 
During World War II, William Grayson participated in no fewer than 32 convoys supplying the war effort. The list below, sorted chronologically, most likely represents the complete list of convoys that include William Grayson, but does not represent an exhaustive search.
 Convoy GZ.9   (Oct 1942: Guantanamo - Cristobal)
 Convoy NG.313   (Oct 1942: NYC - Guantanamo)
 Convoy CA.1  (Dec 1942: Cape Town - Dispersed)
 Convoy DC.21  (Apr 1943: Durban - Cape Town)
 Convoy PA.32  (Apr 1943: Bandar abbas - Aden)
 Convoy BT.14  (May 1943: Bahia - Trinidad)
 Convoy CN.19  (May 1943: Cape Town - Dispersed)
 Convoy TAG.66   (Jun 1943: Trinidad - Guantanamo)
 Convoy GN.66   (Jun 1943: Guantanamo - NYC)
 Convoy UGS.13   (Jul 1943: Hampton Roads - Port Said)
 Convoy AP.43   (Aug 1943: Aden - Bandar Abbas)
 Convoy GUS.20   (Oct 1943: Alexandria - Hampton Roads)
 Convoy PA.56  (Oct 1943: Bandar abbas - Aden)
 Convoy HX.272   (Dec 1943: NYC - Liverpool)
 Convoy WP.SP 16   (Jan 1944: Milford Haven - Portsmouth)
 Convoy PW.467  (Jan 1944: Portsmouth - M haven)
 Convoy ON.223   (Feb 1944: Liverpool - NYC)
 Convoy HX.283   (Mar 1944: NYC - Liverpool)

After leaving New York City, William Grayson was involved in a collision that damaged her hull. William Grayson made way for St. Johns, Newfoundland for repairs. Following repairs, William Grayson returned to port.
 Convoy UGS.51   (Aug 1944: Hampton Roads - Port Said)
 Convoy GUS.51   (Sep 1944: Port Said - Hampton Roads)
 Convoy KN.342   (Oct 1944: Key West - NYC)
 Convoy HX.319   (Nov 1944: NYC - Liverpool)
 Convoy WVC.16  (Dec 1944: St helens rds - Havre)
 Convoy ON.280   (Jan 1945: Southend - NYC)
 Convoy TBC.43   (Jan 1945: Southend - Milford Haven)
 Convoy BX.149   (Mar 1945: Boston - Halifax)
 Convoy HX.343   (Mar 1945: NYC - Liverpool)
 Convoy TAM.119   (Mar 1945: Southend - Antwerp)
 Convoy ATM.130   (Apr 1945: Antwerp - Southend)
 Convoy ON.298   (Apr 1945: Southend - NYC)

References

Bibliography

 
 
 
 
 
 

 

Liberty ships
Ships built in Baltimore
1942 ships
Liberty ships transferred to Greece